is a platform game developed and published by Nintendo for the arcade VS. System in 1984, and for the Famicom and Nintendo Entertainment System consoles in 1985. The characters Popo and Nana (Pepe and Nana in the German version), collectively known as the Ice Climbers, scale 32 vertically scrolling, ice-covered mountains to recover stolen vegetables from a giant condor. In some European countries, Ice Climber was bundled with the Nintendo Entertainment System.

The arcade version, has an animated title screen, a stage select menu at the start of the game and between levels, 16 more mountains, occasional blizzard and wind effects, more enemy characters, and bonus multiplier items.

Nana and Popo are playable characters in the Super Smash Bros. series, starting with the 2001 game Super Smash Bros. Melee for the GameCube. Nintendo released the NES version for the Nintendo e-Reader in 2002.

Gameplay

The first player controls Popo, a boy wearing a blue parka, while the second player controls Nana, a girl wearing a pink one. The only tool they carry is a wooden mallet to carve openings in the ice above and to club enemies. Each mountain level consists of eight layers of colorful ice and a bonus stage. Standard, dull ice blocks pose no threat other than an easily disposed-of barrier and platform. Square ice blocks with higher detail are indestructible, forcing the player to take another path. Hatched ice acts as a conveyor belt sliding Popo or Nana either left or right. Finally, many mountains include unbreakable moving platforms resembling clouds. The bonus stage takes place at the peak. Within a 40-second time limit and no enemies, the Ice Climbers often face trickier jumps and multiple moving platforms. The peak is also the only place to recover stolen vegetables, most notably eggplants. Collecting just one piece of corn from the fifth bonus stage is the only way to gain an extra life. At the top of the peak, the Condor flies overhead.

Enemies encountered on the way up the mountains include the Topi, Nitpicker, and White Bear. Topis come in two varieties: the blue seal featured in the Japanese Famicom Ice Climber release, and the short yeti seen in Western versions and VS. Ice Climber. Topis have the ability to fill in holes in the floor with ice. To do this, a Topi scouts out an opening in the floor, runs back to its cave, and reemerges pushing an icicle to fill in two blocks. This process repeats until no more openings on their layer of ice exist. The Nitpicker is a small, mountain-dwelling bird that swoops down from icy caves on the levels' edges. Unlike the Topi, which is confined to one floor of the mountain, Nitpickers can cross over multiple ice layers. Taking them into account along with moving platforms and sliding ice, timing jumps can be more difficult. The final enemy is the White Bear. This enemy, wearing sunglasses and pink speedo, appears on screen only when Popo and Nana take too long to advance. Pounding the ice, the Polar Bear forces the screen to move up. If Nana or Popo are forced off the screen, the player loses a life. Other obstacles include deadly falling icicles. These can form on the bottom of any type of platform. After a few successful mountains climbed, all enemies' speeds increase.

The arcade game VS. Ice Climber has a few more gameplay differences. The player must pick from an initial set of 24 mountains to conquer. After eight are cleared, a Super Bonus stage occurs in which the player must reach a high platform. Afterwards, the player must choose from the second set of 24 mountains, in which the Condor is replaced by a giant butterfly. After the next eight stages are cleared and the Super Bonus is over, the player resumes the cycle from the original mountain set. The game keeps track of whether the mountain was claimed by an Ice Climber or if it remains Topi territory—once all the stages are completed, the counter resets. Approximately 30 of the 48 level designs are borrowed from the NES game. Stage setups are generally trickier in VS. Ice Climber, with some new mechanics such as cloud platforms that move diagonal or strong gusts of wind. A purple bee with a spear flying in a horizontal pattern is included as a somewhat rare fourth enemy.

After the bonus stage, the players' scores are tallied. Points are rewarded for every brick of ice destroyed, every Topi-pushed icicle smashed, every Nitpicker killed and every vegetable collected. Finally, a bonus score is rewarded if a player manages to climb to the top of the bonus stage and jump up and grab the Condor. The game keeps track of the high score, although there is no way to save it on the NES version.

The game can be played in one- or two-player mode. The latter places Popo and Nana against each other in a race to the summit. Players may prefer to play cooperatively on the way up, but during the bonus round, they must compete for the top.

Development

Ice Climber and NES Open Tournament Golf were directed by longtime Nintendo producer Kenji Miki. Ice Climber is the first video game programmed by Kazuaki Morita. He considered this a "warm-up" before becoming a main programmer on Super Mario Bros.. Morita was later credited with central programming roles in numerous games within the Super Mario series, The Legend of Zelda series, and in Star Fox 64.

Releases
Ice Climber, a launch game for the NES in North America, has been re-released for several of Nintendo's consoles. The PC-8801 version has a more limited color palette and a reworked HUD. VS. Ice Climber has been re-released for the Famicom Disk System, removing the difficulty settings and changing a few graphics to be closer to Ice Climber (such as the bee and butterfly replaced by a Nitpicker and blue Condor, respectively). It has also been released in the Arcade Archives series on Nintendo Switch, although the bee enemy has been removed. Including the releases listed below, the NES game is unlockable in the 2002 GameCube release of Animal Crossing. It can only be officially unlocked via a North America-exclusive e-Reader card, or as a gift to players requesting their save data be transferred from the Japanese-exclusive Nintendo 64 version to the Doubutsu no Mori+ edition.

Reception
In Japan, Game Machine listed VS. Ice Climbers in its April 1, 1985, issue as the eighth most-successful table arcade unit of the month. Former President of Finland Mauno Koivisto was reportedly keen on Nintendo games and his son-in-law has reported that Ice Climber was his favorite game.

Reviewing the American release, Computer Entertainer magazine called it "addictive" for fans of climbing games. The reviewer awarded 3.5 out of 4 stars, for each category of graphics and varied gameplay, which provide "hours of challenging play".

Legacy

Popo and Nana appear in the Super Smash Bros. series of fighting game as a two-in-one playable fighter under the name Ice Climbers, voiced by Sanae Kobayashi. Appearing in 2001's Super Smash Bros. Melee, and 2008's Super Smash Bros. Brawl, their return was planned for Super Smash Bros. for Nintendo 3DS and Wii U, but technical issues with the 3DS version required game director Masahiro Sakurai to scrap development on them to maintain parity between the two versions. He stated that there was not a high priority to include them because the Ice Climber series was "unlikely to have another installment" at the time. The Ice Climbers returned in 2018's Super Smash Bros. Ultimate.

Themes from Ice Climber regularly appear in the WarioWare series' classic Nintendo microgames. In Kirby: Nightmare in Dream Land and Kirby Air Ride, when Kirby gets the Freeze ability, he dons Popo's parka in the same manner it is worn in the Super Smash Bros. series. In Tetris DS, an Ice Climber backdrop appears among other classic Nintendo games. Daigasso! Band Brothers includes the bonus stage music theme. The Ice Climbers appear in Super Mario Maker as an unlockable Mystery Mushroom costume.

Notes

References

External links
Virtual Console: Ice Climber at Nintendo.com
Ice Climber at Killer List of Videogames
Ice Climber at NinDB

1984 video games
Arcade video games
Cooperative video games
Child characters in video games
Nintendo games
Nintendo arcade games
Nintendo e-Reader games
Famicom Disk System games
Game Boy Advance games
Head-to-head arcade video games
Multiplayer and single-player video games
NEC PC-8801 games
Nintendo Research & Development 1 games
Nintendo Entertainment System games
Nintendo Vs. Series games
Platform games
Sharp X1 games
Video games developed in Japan
Video games featuring female protagonists
Video games scored by Akito Nakatsuka
Video games about children
Virtual Console games
Virtual Console games for Wii U
Nintendo Switch Online games
Nintendo Switch games
Virtual Console games for Nintendo 3DS
Hamster Corporation games